Olorus was the name of a king of Thrace. His daughter Hegesipyle married the Athenian statesman and general Miltiades, who defeated the Persians at the Battle of Marathon in 490 BC.

References

Sources
Herodotus, Histories. A. D. Godley (translator), Cambridge: Harvard University Press, 1920; 
Thucydides. The Peloponnesian War. London, J. M. Dent; New York, E. P. Dutton. 1910.

Thracian kings
5th-century BC rulers